Traditional Malaysian instruments are the musical instruments used in the traditional and classical music of Malaysia. They comprise a wide range of wind, string, and percussion instruments, used by both the Malay majority as well as the nation's ethnic minorities.

Percussion Instruments
Bebendil - used in traditional performances in Sabah.
Bonang Baron - used in classical Malay music of Malay Gamelan.
Bungkau - used in traditional performances in Sabah.
Canang
Canang Anak - used in traditional performances such as Wayang Kulit, Mak Yong and Main Puteri.
Canang Ibu - used in traditional performances such as Wayang Kulit, Mak Yong and Main Puteri.
Gabbang - used in traditional performances in Sabah.
Gambang Kayu - used in classical Malay music of Malay Gamelan.
Gedombak
Gedombak Anak - used in traditional performances such as Wayang Kulit
Gedombak Ibu - used in traditional performances such as Wayang Kulit
Geduk
Geduk Anak - used in traditional performances such as Wayang Kulit
Geduk Ibu - used in traditional performances such as Wayang Kulit
Gendang - used in classical Malay music of Nobat and Malay Gamelan, and traditional performances such as Zapin.
Gendang Anak - used in traditional performances such as Wayang Kulit, Mak Yong and Main Puteri.
Gendang Ibu - used in traditional performances such as Wayang Kulit, Mak Yong and Main Puteri.
Gongs or Tetawak  - used in classical Malay music of Nobat and traditional performances such as Dondang Sayang.
Gong Agung - used in classical Malay music of Malay Gamelan.
Gong Anak - used in traditional performances such as Wayang Kulit, Mak Yong and Main Puteri.
Gong Ibu - used in traditional performances such as Wayang Kulit, Mak Yong and Main Puteri.
Kenong - used in classical Malay music of Malay Gamelan.
Kerincing - used in traditional performances such as Wayang Kulit Gedek
Kertok Ulu - used in traditional performances in Terengganu.
Kesi - used in traditional performances such as Wayang Kulit, Mak Yong and Main Puteri.
Kompang - used in traditional performance at weddings.
Konga - used in traditional performances such as Hamdolok
Kulintangan - used in traditional performances in Sabah.
Marakas - used in classical Malay music of Malay Ghazal and Hamdolok.
Marwas - used in traditional performances such as Zapin and Hamdolok.
Mong - used in traditional performances such as Wayang Kulit.
Rebana - used in traditional performances such as Zapin and Dondang Sayang.
Rabana Perak - used in traditional performances in Perak.
Rabana Ubi - used in traditional performances in Kelantan.
Saron
Saron Baron - used in classical Malay music of Malay Gamelan.
Saron Demung - used in classical Malay music of Malay Gamelan.
Tabla - used in classical Malay music of Malay Ghazal.
Tamborin - used in classical Malay music of Malay Ghazal and traditional performances such as Hamdolok.
Togunggak - used in traditional performances in Sabah.

String Instruments

Biola - used in classical Malay music of Malay Ghazal and traditional performances such as Dondang Sayang.
Kreb - used in traditional performances by Orang Asli.
Gambus - used in classical Malay music of Malay Ghazal and traditional performances such as Zapin and Hamdolok.
Gambus Arab 
Gambus Melayu 
Gitar - used in classical Malay music of Malay Ghazal.
Rebab - used in traditional performances such as Wayang Kulit Melayu, Mak Yong and Main Puteri.
Sape - used in traditional performances in Sarawak.
Sundatang - used in traditional performances in Sabah.
Tongkungon - used in traditional performances in Sabah.

Wind Instruments

Accordion 
Harmonium - used in classical Malay music of Malay Ghazal.
Nafiri - used in classical Malay music of Nobat 
Seruling
Serunai - used in classical Malay music of Nobat and traditional performances such as Wayang Kulit, Menora and Silat.
Serunai Anak - used in traditional performances such as Wayang Kulit
Serunai Ibu - used in traditional performances such as Wayang Kulit
Sompoton - used in traditional performances in Sabah
Turali - used in traditional performances in Sabah

See also 

Music of Malaysia

References

External links